Best of Rockers & Ballads is a compilation album released by Roger Daltrey in 1991. The music was compiled by Paul Jansen and mastered for CD by Bart Orange.

Track listing 

 "It's A Hard Life" (David Courtney, Leo Sayer)	
 "Giving it All Away" (Courtney, Sayer)
 "Without Your Love"  (Billy Nicholls)
 "Say It Ain't So, Joe" (Murray Head)
 "Leon" (Phillip Goodhand-Tait)
 "The Prisoner" (David Courtney, Todd, Daltrey)
 "Parade" (Goodhand-Tait)	
 "White City Lights" (Billy Nicholls, Jon Lind)
 "Oceans Away" (Goodhand-Tait)		
 "One Man Band" (Courtney, Sayer)		
 "Avenging Annie" (Andy Pratt)			
 "Walking The Dog" (Rufus Thomas) 		
 "One Of The Boys" (Steve Gibbons)			
 "Thinking" (Courtney, Sayer)			 
 "Free Me" (Russ Ballard)			
 "Proud" (Ballard)			
 "Reprise - One Man Band" (Courtney, Sayer)

Song chart positions
 "Giving it All Away" (#5 UK), 1973
 "Without Your Love" (#20 US), 1980
 "Free Me" (#39 UK), 1980

References 

Roger Daltrey albums
1991 greatest hits albums